Edmund Anderson may refer to:
Edmund Anderson (judge) (1530–1605), Elizabethan judge
Edmund E. Anderson (1906–1989), industrial designer
Sir Edmund Anderson, 1st Baronet (died 1630), of the Anderson baronets
Sir Edmund Anderson, 3rd Baronet, of the Anderson baronets
Sir Edmund Anderson, 4th Baronet, of the Anderson baronets
Sir Edmund Anderson, 5th Baronet, of the Anderson baronets
Sir Edmund Anderson, 7th Baronet, of the Anderson baronets

See also
Edward Anderson (disambiguation)